Sanju Viswanath Samson (born 11 November 1994) is an Indian international cricketer who captains Kerala in domestic cricket and Rajasthan Royals in Indian Premier League. A right-handed wicket-keeper-batter, he was the vice-captain of the Indian U-19 team for the 2014 Under-19 Cricket World Cup. He made his India debut in the 2015 away T20I against Zimbabwe. He made his ODI debut in 2021 against Sri Lanka.

Sanju started his cricketing career in Delhi and later moved to Kerala. After creating waves in junior cricket, he made his first-class debut for Kerala in 2011. He made his IPL debut in 2013 for Rajasthan Royals and won the Emerging Player of the Year.  He scored an unbeaten 212 in the 2019-20 Vijay Hazare Trophy in the sixth instance an Indian scored a double-century in List A cricket, which is also the second-fastest double ton in the format.

Early life 

Sanju was born on 11 November 1994 into a Latin Catholic Malayali family in  Pulluvila, a coastal village near Vizhinjam in Thiruvananthapuram district of Kerala. His father, Samson Viswanath, was formerly a police constable at Delhi Police and a retired football player who has represented Delhi in Santhosh Trophy and his mother, Ligy Viswanath is a housewife. His elder brother Saly Samson has represented Kerala in Junior cricket and currently works in the AG's office.

Sanju spent his early childhood in the Police residential colony in North Delhi neighbourhood of GTB Nagar and studied at Rosary Senior Secondary School,
Delhi. He trained under coach Yashpal at the academy in DL DAV Model School, Shalimar Bagh. When Sanju didn't make it into the Delhi U-13 team for Dhruv Pandove Trophy, his father took voluntary retirement from the Delhi police force; a year after he retired from football and moved to Kerala, where Sanju and his brother continued their cricketing careers. In Kerala, he attended Masters Cricket Club in Thiruvananthapuram before changing academies to train under Biju George on Medical College Ground, Thiruvananthapuram.

Sanju graduated high school from St. Joseph's Higher Secondary School, Thiruvananthapuram, Kerala. He pursued a B.A. degree in English literature from Mar Ivanios College, Thiruvananthapuram. Apart from cricket, his childhood aspiration was to become an IPS officer.

Youth and domestic career

Youth career

Sanju was a member of the U-13 cricket team of Kerala in 2007. In the KSCA Inter-State under-13 tournament, he captained Kerala and bagged the player of the tournament award scoring 973 runs, including four centuries in five matches at an average of 108.11. As a member of Kerala U-15 team for the 2008-09 Vijay Merchant Trophy, he scored a double century off 138 balls against Goa and finished the tournament as the second-highest run-scorer with 498 runs including two centuries and two fifties. He was also the captain of Kerala in U-16 and U-19 levels.

His performance in the 2010-11 Cooch Behar Trophy earned him a spot in the India U-19 team that played the 2012 ACC Under-19 Asia Cup held in Malaysia in June 2012. His dismal show in the tournament meant that he failed to get selected to India's squad for the 2012 Under-19 Cricket World Cup that followed. He was named vice-captain of India U-19 team for the 2013 Top End Under-19 Series in Australia in June 2013. He scored two half-centuries in India U-19's Youth Test series against Sri Lanka held from July to August 2013. In the 2013 ACC Under 19 Asia cup in UAE, he scored a century in the final against Pakistan, helping India retain the cup. He was also India's vice-captain in the tournament. In January 2014, BCCI appointed Sanju as vice-captain of team India for the 2014 Under-19 Cricket World Cup. He was the top run-scorer for India in the tournament with a highest score of 85 runs from 45 balls against Papua New Guinea.

Early domestic career

A double-century in the 2008-09 Vijay Merchant Trophy paved way to the Kerala squad for the 2009-10 Ranji Trophy. Then aged 14, he was the youngest Kerala cricketer to be selected to play in Ranji Trophy. He was named in the Kerala squad for the 2009-10 Syed Mushtaq Ali Trophy the same year. He made his first-class debut for the side in the 2011-12 Ranji Trophy on 3 November 2011 against Vidarbha and Twenty20 debut on 16 October 2011 against Hyderabad in the 2011-12 Syed Mushtaq Ali Trophy. He was named in the Kerala squad for playing the 2011-12 Vijay Hazare Trophy and made his List-A debut on 23 February 2012 against Andhra Pradesh in the season.

He scored moderately in the 2012–13 Vijay Hazare Trophy in which Kerala featured in the semi-finals. He scored his maiden first-class century against Himachal Pradesh in the 2012-13 Ranji Trophy, as he scored 127 runs off 207 balls. He was Kerala's highest run-getter in 2013-14 Ranji Trophy season scoring 530 runs at an average of 58.88. In his first match of the 2013–14 season against Assam he scored a career-best 211 to bring up his first double century in Ranji Trophy. In the second match against Andhra Pradesh he scored 115 from 281 balls in the 1st innings followed by 51* in the second innings. He was named in South Zone's squad to play in the 2013-14 Deodhar Trophy in March 2014. On the Australia A Team Quadrangular Series in 2014, he finished as India A's highest run-scorer with 244 runs from seven innings, with an average of 81.33. He scored his second first-class double century in the 2014-15 Ranji Trophy. He was named in South Zone's squad to play in the 2014-15 Deodhar Trophy in November 2014.

Inconsistent seasons

Sanju was appointed as the captain of Kerala for the 2015–16 Ranji Trophy season. Then aged 20, he is the youngest Kerala player to captain the state in Ranji Trophy. He began the season with a ton but failed to convert it into a successful season.

He started the next Ranji season scoring a 154 against Jammu and Kashmir but again failed to impress the rest of the season. He was issued a show-cause notice by Kerala Cricket Association for alleged acts of indiscipline during a match in the tournament.

Return to form
Sanju was the leading run-scorer for Kerala in the 2017–18 Ranji Trophy, with 627 runs from seven matches. In a must-win match against Saurashtra, he scored a 68 in the first innings and smashed a 180 ball 175 in the second innings, helping his team claim a 309 runs victory and quarter-final berth. Kerala went on to play its first quarter-final in Ranji Trophy history in the season with Samson being one of their top performers.

In November 2017, he was appointed as the captain of the Board President's XI, replacing an injured Naman Ojha for a two-day tour match against Sri Lanka. He scored a century against the visiting team ending the match in a draw.

In August 2018, he was one of eight players that were fined by the Kerala Cricket Association, after showing dissent against Kerala's captain, Sachin Baby.

In September 2019, he scored 91 runs off 48 balls in the fifth unofficial List-A match between India A and South Africa A team and was awarded the man-of-the-match award. In October 2019, during the 2019–20 Vijay Hazare Trophy match between Kerala and Goa, Sanju doubled his maiden List-A century. It was the second-fastest double hundred and the fastest by an Indian in the format. It was also the highest total made by a wicket-keeper in a List-A match with an unbeaten 212 runs from 129 balls. His partnership of 338 runs with Kerala skipper Sachin Baby in the match is the highest in List-A cricket for Indian cricket and the third highest in the format. The impact made from this innings went on to earn him a national call-up after four years, as he was selected to play the Bangladesh series that followed.

He was named the captain of Kerala ahead of the 2020–21 Syed Mushtaq Ali Trophy. Kerala played the quarter-finals of the 2021-22 Syed Mushtaq Ali Trophy and 2021-22 Vijay Hazare Trophy under his leadership.

In September 2022, he was named captain of the India A squad playing a 3 ODI-series against New Zealand A cricket team. India whitewashed New Zealand, with Samson being the highest run-getter of the series.

International cricket

Maiden callup and debut (2014-15)
In August 2014, Sanju was selected to India's 17-man squad to play in 5 ODIs and a Twenty20 against England. However, he did not make it to the final eleven in any of the matches and remained a backup keeper to MS Dhoni. In October 2014, he was called to the Twenty20 team to play a solitary T-20 against West Indies, which later got cancelled. In December 2014, he was named in India's 30-member probables list for the 2015 Cricket World Cup. In July 2015, he was drafted into the Indian squad against Zimbabwe for an ODI and two T20I matches as an injury replacement for Ambati Rayudu. He made his T20I debut against Zimbabwe at Harare on 19 July 2015. After a top-order collapse, Samson added 36 runs in the sixth wicket, along with Stuart Binny in a low-score chase. India eventually lost the match to Zimbabwe by 10 runs.

Comeback and a stop-start career (2019-21)
In October 2019, he was recalled to the Indian side after four years as a part of India's Twenty20 International (T20I) squad for their series against Bangladesh; but was benched in the whole series. In November 2019, he was added to the Indian team for T20I series against West Indies after an injury to Shikhar Dhawan. In December 2019, he was named in the Twenty 20 squad to play against Sri Lanka. He featured in the third T20I and was dismissed in the second ball, after hitting the first for a sixer. He was selected for the T20I series of the India tour of New Zealand replacing an injured Shikhar Dhawan but failed to create the desired impact with the bat with a string of low scores.

In October 2020, he was named in India's Twenty20 International (T20I) squad for their series against Australia. On 9 November 2020, he was added to India's One Day International (ODI) squad, also for their series against Australia. He played all the three Twenty20s but flattered to deceive. He was dropped from India's Twenty20 International squad for their next series against England.

In June 2021, he was named in India's One Day International (ODI) and Twenty20 International (T20I) squads for their series against Sri Lanka. He made his ODI debut on 23 July 2021, for India against Sri Lanka. He disappointed with the bat in the T20 series in which a depleted Team India lost to Sri Lanka. He missed out from the Indian squad for the 2021 ICC Men's T20 World Cup, held in October 2021.

Among the runs (2022-present)
In February 2022, he was named in India's T20 squad for their series against Sri Lanka. He didn't bat in the first match but scored 39 and 18 in the next two matches. In June 2022, he was named in India's squad for their T20I series against Ireland. In the second match of the series, he scored his maiden half century in T20I, making 77 runs off 42 balls. His partnership with Deepak Hooda of 176 runs was the highest partnership for the second wicket in men's T20I and the highest partnership for any wicket for India.

In June 2022, he was named in India's squad for the first T20I of their series against England, but didn't feature in the starting eleven. In July 2022, he was named in India's ODI squad for their away series against the West Indies. He scored his maiden ODI half-century in the second match of the series. His 99-run partnership with Shreyas Iyer in the fourth wicket set the foundation for India's victory. On 29 July 2022, he was added to India's Twenty 20 International (T20I) squad, also for their series against West Indies, after KL Rahul tested positive for COVID-19. The same month, he was named in India's One Day International (ODI) squad for their series against Zimbabwe.  In the second ODI against Zimbabwe, he scored an unbeaten 43 and took three catches and was declared the man of the match.

In October 2022, he was named in India's squad against South Africa for three ODIs. He scored an unbeaten 86 runs off 63 balls in the first ODI, but ended up in the losing side.

Indian Premier League

Sanju was named by Kolkata Knight Riders in its player pool ahead of 2009 Indian Premier League. He was signed by Kolkata Knight Riders ahead of 2012 Indian Premier League but did not get to play and was released ahead of the 2013 season. He was signed to play for Rajasthan Royals in 2013. He made his IPL debut for Rajasthan against Kings XI Punjab on 14 April 2013 after the regular wicket-keeper Dishant Yagnik failed to recover from an injury. In his second match, he scored 63 runs from 41 balls, becoming the then youngest player in IPL to score a half-century. He won the Best Young Player award of 2013 season with 206 runs and six stumpings from 10 innings.

Sanju made his Champions League Twenty20 debut for Rajasthan Royals against the Mumbai Indians on 21 September 2013 and scored 54 off 47 balls, becoming the youngest player to score a half-century in CLT20. He was retained by Rajasthan ahead of the 2014 season.

In 2016, Delhi Daredevils signed Sanju after Rajasthan was banned from the competition for two years after being found guilty in illegal betting and match-fixing probe. He scored his maiden T20 century against Rising Pune Supergiants during the 2017 Indian Premier League.

He returned to Rajasthan in the 2018 IPL auction He scored his second IPL century in the next season, hitting an unbeaten 102* against Sunrisers Hyderabad. During the 2020 season, Sanju scored a 32-ball 74 against Chennai Super Kings. He led Rajasthan to the highest successful run chase in IPL history with 85 runs from 42 balls against Kings XI Punjab in the next match. He played his 100th IPL match, later in the season.

In January 2021, Sanju was named the captain of Rajasthan Royals ahead of the 2021 Indian Premier League. He scored a century in his first match as captain, becoming the first IPL captain to achieve the feat. He completed 3000 runs in IPL later in the season.

In November 2021, he was retained by Rajasthan Royals ahead of the 2022 Indian Premier League. Sanju surpassed Ajinkya Rahane to become the all-time leading run-scorer for Rajasthan during the season. Rajasthan went on to play the finals and finished as the runners-up under his leadership.

Playing style 

Sanju is a naturally aggressive and elegant batsman who is hailed as a natural talent with quality batting techniques and wicket-keeping skills.  He holds the bat high on the handle and keeps a loose shoulder, and is equipped with fast hands, powerful forearms and excellent hand-eye coordination. He is considered an excellent timer of the ball who mostly sticks to his range between cover and fine-leg. He prefers to stay still at the crease and rarely moves down the track to play shots. He has the ability to play straight and prefers to hit straight over the bowler's head. He can play aerial shots without moving his head.

His power has been compared to powerful stroke-makers such as Rohit Sharma and AB de Villiers who can middle the ball to play shots with seemingly minimal effort. His batting style has been described as "fearless" in Twenty20 cricket. However, he has a weakness in rotating strike.

He is also an athletic fielder who generally fields in the outfield, but is flexible to field in any position. He has been often criticized for being inconsistent over the years. He has also been often criticized for his shot selections and temperament.

Outside cricket 

As of 2016, Sanju is working as the manager of Bharat Petroleum, Thiruvananthapuram. In 2018, he started a sports academy, namely "Six Guns Sports Academy", devoted to cricket and football training for young players in Thiruvananthapuram. He was appointed as the State election icon of Kerala, ahead of the 2021 Kerala Legislative Assembly election. In February 2023, Indian Super League club Kerala Blasters FC announced the appointment of Sanju as its brand ambassador to represent the club and its values on and off the field.

Personal life

Sanju announced his marriage with his long-time girlfriend Charulatha Remesh, a native of Thiruvananthapuram, on 8 September 2018 through his social media platforms. The couple were college-mates from Mar Ivanios College. The marriage took place in a private ceremony at Kovalam on 22 December 2018. The wedding reception took place in Nalanchira on the same day with the only notable cricketer to attend being Sanju's former coach and mentor, Rahul Dravid.

Commercial endorsements
Samson has been sponsored by the brands like MRF (2014-2015), Kookaburra (2019-2020), SS (2016-2019; 2020–2021) and SG (2021–present). He has endorsed other brands - including BharatPe, Myfab11, Baseline Ventures, Club Mahindra, Haeal and Gillette.

Notes

References

External links 

 
 
Sanju Samson at Wisden India

1994 births
Living people
Indian cricketers
India One Day International cricketers
India Twenty20 International cricketers
Cricketers from Thiruvananthapuram
Kerala cricketers
Rajasthan Royals cricketers
Delhi Capitals cricketers
Kolkata Knight Riders cricketers
Indian A cricketers
West Zone cricketers
Wicket-keepers